The Kantale Dam is a large embankment dam built in Kantale, Trincomalee District, Sri Lanka, used for irrigation. It has since been reconstructed. The dam impounds the Per Aru, a small river discharging into the Koddiyar Bay, at Trincomalee Harbour.

Reservoir history 
The tank was built by King Aggabodhi II (604-614 AD) and further developed by King Parakramabahu the Great. It was also known as Gangathala Vapi at the time.

1986 Dam failure 
On  at 03:00 AM, the dam breached, sending a wall of water over the villages downstream. One of the main causes of the breach was said to be due to extra-heavy vehicles being driven over the dam.

References

External links 
 

Buildings and structures in Trincomalee District
Dams in Sri Lanka
Dam failures in Asia
1986 in Sri Lanka
Man-made disasters in Sri Lanka
1986 disasters in Sri Lanka